Anja Osterman (born 27 January 1993) is a Slovenian sprint canoeist.

She won a medal at the 2019 ICF Canoe Sprint World Championships.

References

External links
 

1993 births
Living people
ICF Canoe Sprint World Championships medalists in kayak
Slovenian female canoeists
Competitors at the 2018 Mediterranean Games
Mediterranean Games bronze medalists for Slovenia
Mediterranean Games medalists in canoeing
Canoeists at the 2020 Summer Olympics
Olympic canoeists of Slovenia
20th-century Slovenian women
21st-century Slovenian women